Charles Alvin Gabriel (January 21, 1928 – September 4, 2003) was the 11th Chief of Staff of the United States Air Force. As chief of staff, Gabriel served in a dual capacity. He was a member of the Joint Chiefs of Staff which, as a body, acts as the principal military adviser to the president, the National Security Council, and the Secretary of Defense. In his other capacity, he was responsible to the Secretary of the Air Force for managing the vast human and materiel resources of the world's most powerful aerospace force.

Early life and education
Gabriel was born in Lincolnton, North Carolina, on January 21, 1928. Following graduation from high school, he attended Catawba College, Salisbury, North Carolina, for two years before entering the United States Military Academy. He graduated from the academy in 1950 with a Bachelor of Science degree and a commission in the United States Air Force. Gabriel earned a Master of Science degree in engineering management from George Washington University, Washington, D.C., in 1963. He graduated from the Command and Staff Course at the Naval War College, Newport, Rhode Island, in 1962; and the Industrial College of the Armed Forces, Fort Lesley J. McNair, Washington, D.C., in 1967.

Military career
After graduation from West Point, Gabriel entered pilot training at Goodfellow Air Force Base, Texas, and completed advanced training at Craig Air Force Base, Alabama, in December 1951. His first assignment was to South Korea, where he flew 100 combat missions in F-51 Mustangs and F-86 Sabres and was credited with shooting down two MiG-15s.

From December 1952 to November 1955, Gabriel was assigned to the 86th Fighter-Interceptor Wing, Landstuhl Air Base, Germany, as a pilot and later a squadron air operations officer. He then spent three years as an air officer commanding at the United States Air Force Academy, Colorado.

In July 1959, Gabriel transferred to Moody Air Force Base, Georgia, where he served as adjutant for the 3550th Pilot Training Group and commander of the Headquarters Squadron Section. Following graduation from the Naval War College in August 1962 and completion of his master's degree at George Washington University in August 1963, he was assigned as a staff officer in the Directorate of Plans, Headquarters U.S. Air Force, Washington, D.C. In August 1966 he entered the Industrial College of the Armed Forces.

Returning to Europe in August 1967, Gabriel served as executive officer to the chief of staff, Supreme Headquarters Allied Powers Europe, Mons, Belgium. He returned to the United States for combat crew training in July 1970 and was subsequently assigned as commander of the 432nd Tactical Reconnaissance Wing at Udon Royal Thai Air Force Base, Thailand, flying 152 combat missions in F-4 Phantom IIs. While wing commander he accepted orders from General John D. Lavelle to falsify classified operations reports. General Lavelle was forced to retire because of these orders. He returned to the Air Staff in July 1972, as deputy for operational forces and deputy director of operations.

Gabriel served as deputy chief of staff for operations at Headquarters Tactical Air Command, Langley Air Force Base, Virginia, from February 1975 to August 1977. He then became deputy commander in chief, U.S. Forces Korea and deputy commander in chief, United Nations Command, Seoul, South Korea.

In April 1979, Gabriel returned to Air Force headquarters as deputy chief of staff for operations, plans and readiness. He served as commander in chief, United States Air Forces in Europe and commander of Allied Air Forces Central Europe at Ramstein Air Base, Germany, from July 1980 to June 1982. Gabriel was promoted to general on August 1, 1980, and retired on July 1, 1986. 

Gabriel died in Arlington County, Virginia, of Alzheimer's disease, on September 4, 2003. He is buried at Arlington National Cemetery.

Flight information

Awards and decorations

References

Official USAF Biography

See also
List of commanders of USAFE

1928 births
2003 deaths
United States Air Force generals
Chiefs of Staff of the United States Air Force
United States Air Force personnel of the Korean War
United States Air Force personnel of the Vietnam War
American Korean War pilots
American Vietnam War pilots
United States Military Academy alumni
Recipients of the Legion of Merit
Recipients of the Distinguished Flying Cross (United States)
George Washington University School of Engineering and Applied Science alumni
Commanders Crosses of the Order of Merit of the Federal Republic of Germany
Recipients of the Air Medal
Order of National Security Merit members
Recipients of the Order of the Sword (United States)
Recipients of the Defense Distinguished Service Medal
Recipients of the Air Force Distinguished Service Medal
People from Lincolnton, North Carolina
Burials at Arlington National Cemetery